Mutik Tsenpo or Murug Tsenpo is sometimes considered to have been one of the emperors of Tibet. This is, however, very questionable. Moreover, the whole period between the reigns of Trisong Detsen and Sadnalegs is very unclear, with several conflicting reports.

Trisong Detsen is said to have had four sons: Mutri Tsenpo, Muné Tsenpo, Mutik Tsenpo, and Sadnalegs. The eldest son, Mutri Tsenpo, died early.

Muné Tsenpo is said to have taken power when his father, Trisong Detsen retired (probably around 797 CE). After a short reign, Muné Tsenpo, was supposedly poisoned on the orders of his mother, Tsephongsa, who was jealous of his beautiful young wife, Queen Phoyongsa. After his death, Mutik Tsenpo was next in line to the throne.

Several sources, however, claim that Mutik Tsenpo murdered a senior minister and was exiled to Lhodak Kharchu (lHo-brag or Lhodrag), near the Bhutanese border in the south, so the throne was taken by Sadnalegs instead.

Some sources say that Mutik Tsenpo was later killed by members of sNa-nam clan, but this couldn't have happened until after Sadnalegs became king, as Sadnalegs mentions in an inscription at Zhwa'i-lha-khang that he took power from his father, that one of his brothers had died, and that he bound his elder brother, Mur-rug-brtsan, with an oath.

Reincarnation 
Orgyen Lingpa (1323 – 1360) was said to be his seventh incarnarnation.

References

Tibetan emperors
8th-century rulers in Asia
8th-century Tibetan people
8th-century births
8th-century deaths
Date of birth unknown
Date of death unknown